Guennady Anatolyevich Moiseev (February 3, 1948 – July 23, 2017) was a Russian former Grand Prix motocross racer. He was a three-time 250cc motocross world champion.

Motorcycle racing career
Moiseev was born in the Gatchina district of the Leningrad Oblast. He decided to take up the sport of motocross after witnessing the 1964 Motocross World Championship round held in Leningrad. In the same year, he was admitted to the motocross section of the Leningrad Pioneers Palace. He competed in his first world championship event in 1967 and won the Russian 250cc Motocross National Championship in 1970.

He was the 1974 F.I.M. world champion in the 250cc class on a KTM motorcycle. He reached the title in the last race, in the struggle with the other title contender Jaroslav Falta. In 1976, he narrowly lost the 250 world championship by one point to Heikki Mikkola despite a late season charge. He won two more 250 world championships in 1977 and 1978, again while riding KTM motorcycles. In 1978 he was a member of the winning Russian team in the Motocross des Nations. Moiseev won a race for the last time in 1979 when friction developed between the USSR Motorcycling Federation and the KTM factory. As a result, KTM withdrew their support of the Russian team. Without competitive motorcycles, the Soviet team could no longer compete against the Western European and Japanese factory racing teams.

Later life
Moiseev, like many Soviet sports stars of his era, was enlisted in the Soviet Army, rising to the ranks of Major during his racing career. His extreme fitness combined with team tactics made him a fearsome competitor. After retiring from competition, Moiseev became a motocross coach. In 1977, Moiseev was awarded the Order of the Red Banner of Labour and, in 1978 he was given the honorary title of "Honored Master of Sports." In December 2000, he was elected president of the Russian Motorcycle Federation. He died on July 23, 2017.

References

External links 
 Guennady Moiseev biography 
 Guennady Moiseev biography 

1948 births
2017 deaths
Russian motocross riders
Soviet motocross riders
Sportspeople from Saint Petersburg
People from Gatchina
Honoured Masters of Sport of the USSR